The National Alliance of Kenya is a political party founded by Lawrence Nginyo Kariuki.

See also 
 List of political parties in Kenya

References 

Political parties in Kenya